The Indian Law Institute (ILI) is a Deemed University and socio-legal research institute, founded in 1956. Established in New Delhi, primarily with the objective of promoting and conducting legal research, education and training. The objectives of the Institute as laid down in its Memorandum of Association are to cultivate the science of law, to promote advanced studies and research in law so as to meet the social, economic and other needs of the Indian people, to promote systematization of law, to encourage and conduct investigations in legal and allied fields, to improve legal education, to impart instructions in law, and to publish studies, books, periodicals, etc.

Institute was instrumental in organizing International conference on Global Environment and  Disaster Management Law Society in 2011.

History
It was formally inaugurated by the President of India, Dr. Rajendra Prasad on 12 December 1957. Dr. A.T. Markose was the Founder Director of the Institute from 1957-1963. The Institute is an autonomous body registered under the Societies Registration Act, 1860, the Indian Law Institute has the requisite independence and academic freedom to carry out its objectives. The membership of the Institute is now nearly three thousand representing the persons interested in the study and advancement of law.

Organisation and administration

Governance
Hon’ble Chief Justice of India is the ex officio President of the Institute. The Law Minister of Government of India & the Attorney-General for India are its ex officio Vice Presidents. Third Vice-President is elected by the members of the Governing Council, from among themselves. Judges of the Hon’ble Supreme Court of India and High Courts, prominent lawyers, Government officials and Professors of Law are represented in the Governing Council of the Institute.

Dharmendra Singh Sengar, was Director of Indian Law Institute from July 2009 – August 2011. In 2013 Manoj Kumar Sinha was appointed the Director of the institute.

Academics
The Indian Law Institute has been granted Deemed University Status in 2004 vide Government of India, Ministry of Human Resource Development Notification No. F.9-9/2001-U.3 dated 29.10.2004. After that in 2005, the institute enrolled its first batch of L.L.M. and Ph.D. program, and later also started research based courses.

Rankings
 
Indian law Institute was ranked 18th in India in the National Institutional Ranking Framework (NIRF) law ranking in 2020.

Library
The Institute's Library has more than 75000 titles and subscribes to 270 current legal periodicals. JILI is the law journal published by the Institute. ASIL contains surveys of leading reported court cases in India in a year and same are analysed by academicians and practitioners.

Publications
ILI publishes various books and two Journals. JILI(Journal of the Indian law Institute) is an international journal for academicians, researchers, advocates, judges etc. This is edited by Dr Jyoti Dogra Sood, Assistant Research Professor.  It has another journal ILI Law review which is an online law journal specially for law students, though academicians, researchers, advocates, and judges may also contribute. This is edited by Dr Anurag Deep, Professor of law, ILI.

Annual Survey of Indian Law
The Annual Survey of Indian Law (ISSN: 0570-2666; Annu. Surv. Indian Law) is an Indian law journal published by the Indian Law Institute. It was established in 1965 and the editor-in-chief is Manoj Kumar Sinha.

Courses Offered

Degree Courses
 Ph.D. in Law
 LL.M. - 1-year course

P.G. Diploma Courses
 Alternative Dispute Resolution (ADRs)
 Corporate Laws & Management 
 Cyber Law
 Drafting of Legislation, Treaties and Agreements  (Not available)
 Environmental Law & Management (Not available)
 Human Rights Law (Not available)
 Intellectual Property Rights Law   
 International Trade Law  (Not available)
 Labour Law (Not available)
 Securities & Banking Laws (Not available)
 Tax Law (Not available)

Online Certificate Courses (3 months) 
 Cyber Law
 Intellectual Property Rights and Information Technology in the Internet Age

Notable faculty
 Lotika Sarkar

References 

http://ili.ac.in/faculty.html
https://llm-guide.com › Schools › Asia › India
http://www.legalexpress.co.in

External links
 Official website
Legal Express: An International Journal of Law
 

Legal research institutes
Research institutes established in 1956
1956 establishments in Delhi
Law schools in Delhi
Deemed universities in India